Microbacterium azadirachtae is a Gram-positive, non-spore-forming and motile bacterium from the genus Microbacterium which has been isolated from the rhizoplane of the plant Azadirachta indica from the Botanical Garden of Coimbatore in India. Microbacterium azadirachtae can promote plant growth by producing phytohormones.

References

Further reading

External links
Type strain of Microbacterium azadirachtae at BacDive -  the Bacterial Diversity Metadatabase	

Bacteria described in 2010
azadirachtae